The 1994 Florida Citrus Bowl was a college football bowl game featuring the Penn State Nittany Lions of the Big Ten, against the Tennessee Volunteers of the SEC.

Scoring summary
First quarter
Tennessee – Becksvoort 46 yard Field goal 11:54 1st- Tenn 3, Penn St 0
Tennessee – Fleming 19 yard pass from Heath Shuler (Becksvoort kick) 9:13 1st – Tenn 10, Penn St 0
Penn State – Ki-Jana Carter 3 yard run (Fayak kick) 4:36 1st – Tenn 10, Penn St 7

Second quarter
Penn State – Fayak 19 yard Field goal 10:22 2nd – Tenn 10, Penn St 10
Tennessee – Becksvoort 50 yard Field goal 1:08 2nd – Tenn 13, Penn St 10
Penn State – Carter 14 yard run (Fayak kick) 0:03 2nd – Penn St 17, Tenn 13

Third quarter
Penn State – Kyle Brady 7 yard pass from Kerry Collins (Fayak kick) 9:55 3rd – Penn St 24, Tenn 13

Fourth quarter
Penn State – Bobby Engram 15 yard pass from Collins (Fayak kick) 14:28 4th – Penn St 31, Tenn 13

References

Florida Citrus Bowl
Citrus Bowl (game)
Penn State Nittany Lions football bowl games
Tennessee Volunteers football bowl games
Florida Citrus Bowl
Florida Citrus Bowl